Callistege regia is a moth of the family Erebidae. It is found in Russia (western Siberia), Afghanistan, Tajikistan and Kyrgyzstan.

References

Moths described in 1888
Callistege
Moths of Asia
Taxa named by Otto Staudinger